The year 1802 in science and technology involved some significant events, listed below.

Astronomy
 March 28 – H. W. Olbers discovers the asteroid Pallas, the second known.
 May 6 – William Herschel coins the term asteroid and on July 1 first uses the term binary star to refer to a star which revolves around another.

Biology
 Pierre André Latreille begins publication of his Histoire naturelle générale et particulière des crustacés et insectes.
 George Montagu publishes his Ornithological Dictionary; or Alphabetical Synopsis of British Birds.
 In the history of evolutionary thought
 Jean-Baptiste Lamarck publishes Recherches sur l'Organisation des Corps Vivants, proposing that all life is organized in a vertical chain of progressive complexity.
 Gottfried Reinhold Treviranus begins publication of Biologie; oder die Philosophie der lebenden Natur, proposing a theory of the transmutation of species.

Chemistry
 June – The first account of Thomas Wedgwood's experiments in photography using silver nitrate is published by Humphry Davy in the Journal of the Royal Institution in London. Since a fixative for the image has not yet been devised, the early photographs quickly fade.
 July – William Hyde Wollaston notes the discovery of the noble metal palladium.
 Charles's law (the "law of volumes"), describing how gases tend to expand when heated, is first published in France by Joseph Louis Gay-Lussac.

Ecology
 Civil engineer and geographer François Antoine Rauch publishes Harmonie hydro-végétale et météorologique: ou recherches sur les moyens de recréer avec nos forêts la force des températures et la régularité des saisons par des plantations raisonnées in Paris, arguing against deforestation.

Geology
 James Smithson proves that zinc carbonates are true carbonate minerals and not zinc oxides, as was previously thought.
 John Playfair publishes Illustrations of the Huttonian Theory of the Earth in Edinburgh, popularising James Hutton's theory of geology.
 James Sowerby begins to issue his British Mineralogy, or, coloured figures intended to elucidate the mineralogy of Great Britain in London, the first comprehensive illustrated reference work on the subject.

Medicine
 June – The first pediatric hospital, the Hôpital des Enfants Malades, opens in Paris, on the site of a previous orphanage.
 London Fever Hospital founded.
 Charles Bell  publishes The Anatomy of the Brain, Explained in a Series of Engravings.

Meteorology
 December – Luke Howard presents the basis of the modern classification and nomenclature of clouds, at a lecture in London.

Physics
 Johann Wilhelm Ritter builds the first electrochemical cell.

Surveying
 April 10 – Great Trigonometric Survey of India begins with the measurement of a baseline near Madras.

Technology
 November 5 – Marc Isambard Brunel begins installation of his blockmaking machinery at Portsmouth Block Mills in England.
 George Bodley of Exeter in England patents the first enclosed kitchen stove.

Publications
 January 2 – Rev. Abraham Rees begins publication in London of The New Cyclopædia, or Universal Dictionary of Arts and Sciences.

Awards
 Copley Medal: William Hyde Wollaston

Births
 February 6 – Charles Wheatstone, English inventor (died 1875)
 April 4 – Dorothea Dix, American mental health reformer (died 1887)
 July 9 – Thomas Davenport, American inventor (died 1851)
 August 5 – Niels Henrik Abel, Norwegian mathematician (died 1829)
 October 10 – Hugh Miller, Scottish geologist (suicide 1856)
 December 15 – János Bolyai, Hungarian mathematician (died 1860)

Deaths
 April 14 – John Mackay, Scottish botanist (born 1772)
 April 18 – Erasmus Darwin, English author of Zoonomia (born 1731)
 November 16 – André Michaux, French botanist (born 1746)

References

 
19th century in science
1800s in science